Dan Navarro (born Daniel Anthony Navarro, September 14, 1952) is an American vocalist, guitarist and voice actor best known as half of the duo Lowen & Navarro. He is first cousins with Dave Navarro of Jane's Addiction and Red Hot Chili Peppers.

Discography
Lowen and Navarro
 "We Belong"
Lowen and Navarro
Walking on a Wire (Chameleon Records, 1990)
Broken Moon (Parachute Records, 1993)
Walking on a Wire re-release with bonus tracks (Parachute Records, 1994)
Pendulum (Parachute Records, 1995)
Live Wire (Intersound, 1997)
Scratch at the Door (Intersound, 1998)
Live Radio (Red Hen Records, 2002)
3 For The Road (Mad Raine Music, 2003)
At Long Last...Christmas (Red Hen Records, 2004)
All the Time in the World (Red Hen Records, 2004)
Hogging the Covers (Red Hen Records, 2006)
Learning To Fall (Red Hen Records, 2008)

Solo
Dan Navarro w/ Stonehoney - Live At McCabe's (Red Hen Records, 2009)
Shed My Skin (Red Hen Records, 2018 / Blue Rose Records, 2019)
Skinless: The Shed My Skin Demos (Red Hen Records, 2021)
Horizon Line (Red Hen Records, 2022)

Television and film
 Puss in Boots: The Last Wish - This Is The End (2022)
 Playmobil: The Movie - Viking Leader (2019)
 We Bare Bears - Blue-Eye Ramon (Episode: El Osos) (2018)
 The Book of Life - Chakal (2014)
 The Lorax - Dan's singing voice (2012)
 American Dad! - Roy Rogers McFreely (2009) Played a character named Cilantro
 Prison Break (2007) (writer: "All Along the Watchtower")
 The Office - A Benihana Christmas (2006) (writer: "We Belong")
 Talladega Nights: The Ballad of Ricky Bobby (2006) (writer: "We Belong")
 Diva (2006) (V) (writer: "Mi pasión (We Belong) (Live)")
 Envy (2004) (performer: "Envy", "Old Drunk Philosopher")
 Blue Desert (1991) (writer: "What I Make Myself Believe")
 Casual Sex? (1988) (writer: "(She's A) Wild Card")
 Roxanne (1987) (performer: "PARTY TONIGHT")
  Police Academy 4: Citizens on Patrol (1987) (writer: "It's Time To Move")
 The Ratings Game (1984) (performer: "Sittin' Pretty", "The Goombas", "Gimme Five")

Videogames
 Red Dead Redemption 2 - The Local Pedestrian Population (2018)
 Uncharted 4: A Thief's End - Additional Voices (2016)
 Fallout 4 - Jacob Orden, Dean Volkert (2015)
 Grand Theft Auto: Vice City Stories (2006) (writer: "We Belong")

References

External links
Dan Navarro Official website

Dan Navarro at AllMovie.com
[ Dan Navarro] at AllMusic.com
Dan Navarro at Silverleaf Booking

1952 births
Living people
American male voice actors
American musicians of Mexican descent
Hispanic and Latino American musicians
Singer-songwriters from California
American male actors of Mexican descent